The Japanese Big Four are the large motorcycle manufacturing companies of Japan:

 Honda, which produces motorcycles since 1946.
 Suzuki, which produces motorcycles since 1952.
 Kawasaki, which produces motorcycles since 1954.
 Yamaha, which produces motorcycles since 1955.

Notes

Sources

 

Big four